SM U-124 was one of the 329 submarines serving in the Imperial German Navy in World War I. 
U-124 was engaged in the naval warfare and took part in the First Battle of the Atlantic under the command of Kapitänleutnant Rolf Carls (later a Generaladmiral in the Kriegsmarine).

She was interned at Karlskrona on 13 November 1918, but then surrendered to the Allies at Harwich on 1 December 1918 in accordance with the requirements of the Armistice with Germany. Lying at Portland, she was sold to James Dredging Co. on 3 March 1919 for £3,000, but then re-sold to George Cohen, who towed the boat to Swansea for scrapping. However, U-124 foundered there in October 1920, although was later salvaged and finally broken up.

Design
German Type UE II submarines were preceded by the shorter Type UE I submarines. U-124 had a displacement of  when at the surface and  while submerged. The submarine was powered by two  engines for use while surfaced, and two  engines for use while submerged. She had two shafts and two  propellers.

U-124 was fitted with four  torpedo tubes (fitted at its bow), twelve torpedoes, two  mine chutes (fitted at its stern), forty-two mines, one  SK L/45 deck machine gun, and 494 rounds. She had a complement of forty (thirty-six crew members and four officers).

References

Notes

Citations

Bibliography

World War I submarines of Germany
1918 ships
Ships built in Hamburg
U-boats commissioned in 1918
German Type UE II submarines